The 1998 Towson Tigers football team was an American football team that represented Towson University during the 1998 NCAA Division I-AA football season. Towson tied for last in the Patriot League.

In their seventh year under head coach Gordy Combs, the Tigers compiled a 5–6 record. 

The Tigers were outscored 336 to 243. Their 1–5 conference record tied for sixth (and worst) in the seven-team Patriot League standings. 

Towson played its home games at Minnegan Stadium on the university campus in Towson, Maryland.

Schedule

References

Towson
Towson Tigers football seasons
Towson Tigers football